Philip Strange (4 June 1884 – 5 January 1963) was a British actor.

Selected filmography
 The Ace of Cads (1926)
 Broadway Nights (1927)
 Nevada (1927)
 Wall Street (1929)
 The Unholy Night (1929)
 The Rescue (1929)
 A Notorious Affair (1930)
 Vengeance (1930)
 Strictly Business (1931)
 Black Coffee (1931)
 Money for Nothing (1932)
 Loyalties (1933)
 Mayfair Girl (1933)
 Borrowed Clothes (1934)
 Romance in Rhythm (1934)
 The Scarlet Pimpernel (1934)
 No Escape (1934)
 Jury's Evidence (1936)
 The High Command (1938)
 Trottie True (1949)

References

External links
 

1884 births
1963 deaths
20th-century English male actors
British expatriate male actors in the United States
English male film actors
Male actors from Berkshire
Actors from Chelmsford